Furman, also known as Old Snow Hill, is an unincorporated community in Wilcox County, Alabama, United States.  The Furman Historic District is included on the National Register of Historic Places.

Demographics

Furman was listed as an incorporated community from 1890 to 1930 on the U.S. Census rolls. It either disincorporated or lost its charter after 1930.

Geography

References

Unincorporated communities in Alabama
Unincorporated communities in Wilcox County, Alabama